The British Academy Television Craft Award for Best Editing: Factual is one of the categories presented by the British Academy of Film and Television Arts (BAFTA) within the British Academy Television Craft Awards, the craft awards were established in 2000 with their own, separate ceremony as a way to spotlight technical achievements, without being overshadowed by the main production categories.

Before splitting into two categories for editing in 1992, Best Editing: Factual and Best Editing: Fiction (presented from 1992 to 1994 as Best Film or Video Editor – Factual and Best Film or Video Editor – Fiction respectively), two categories were presented to recognize editing in television programming:
 From 1978 to 1991 Best VTR Editor was presented.
 From 1978 to 1991 Best Film Editor was presented.

Winners and nominees

1990s
Best Film or Video Editor - Factual

Best Editing: Factual

2000s

2010s

2020s

 Note: The series that don't have recipients on the tables had Editing Team credited as recipients for the award or nomination.

See also
 Primetime Emmy Award for Outstanding Picture Editing for a Nonfiction Program

References

External links
 

Editing: Factual